Champions of Magic is a touring illusion show featuring a cast of five magicians, each specializing in a different type of magic from mind reading & close-up to stage filling grand illusions.

History
Champions of Magic opened in the UK in October 2013 at Reading Hexagon Theatre and has since completed 6 UK tours and a run in London. The show completed a US tour in 2017 which was extended due to demand, concluding in March 2018. This included an extended run at the Palace Theatre in Cleveland, Ohio. To date the show has been seen by over 300,000 people and received positive reviews.

Cast 
The show regularly features illusionists Young & Strange, acclaimed mind reader Alex McAleer, escapologist Fernando Velasco and close-up magician Kayla Drescher.

They have a number of onstage assistants alongside an aerialist.

Performance 
The production features mostly original magic that was created or devised by the performers and production designers. The show is known for its production including a large lighting rig and pyrotechnic effects.

Television appearances
The cast of the show have appeared on television multiple times including:

Charity
As part of their 2016 and 2018 UK tour the production held a performance exclusively for children from UK charity Rays of Sunshine at the Mermaid Theatre in London.

When touring they also support Tickets For Troops who provide free tickets to members of the armed forces and their families and Tickets For Kids which provides free tickets to disadvantaged children.

References

External links 
 Champions of Magic

British magicians
Magic shows